Damontae Tyron Kazee (born June 5, 1993) is an American football safety for the Pittsburgh Steelers of the National Football League (NFL). He was drafted by the Atlanta Falcons in the fifth round of the 2017 NFL Draft. He played college football at San Diego State.

Early years
Kazee attended Cajon, where he was a two-way player at cornerback and running back. As a senior in 2011, he registered 27 tackles, 2 interceptions, one forced fumble, 4 rushing touchdowns and 4 receiving touchdowns. He was a three-time All-CIF selection.

He also lettered in basketball and track.

College career
Kazee accepted a football scholarship from San Diego State, following in the footsteps of his older brother Walter, who was a running back with the Aztecs.

As a redshirt freshman he appeared in 13 games as a backup cornerback, missing the eighth against the University of New Mexico with a concussion. He made 41 tackles (3 for loss), one interception, 2 pass breakups, one sack, 4 forced fumbles (tied for fourth in school history) and one blocked kick. He had 4 and one tackle against the Eastern Illinois University. He made 6 tackles and one interception against Ohio State University. He had 5 tackles and one forced fumble against Oregon State University.

As a sophomore, he started all 13 games at cornerback, posting 58 tackles (4 for loss), one 13 pass breakups (led the team), one fumble recovery and 2 quarterback hurries. He had four tackles (three solo) and 3 pass breakups against UNLV. He made 5 tackles against Fresno State University. He had 5 tackles and 2 pass breakups against the University of New Mexico. He made 6 tackles, 2 pass breakups and one interception against the University of Hawai'i. He had 7 tackles, one pass breakup and one quarterback pressure against Boise State University.

As a junior, he started 14 games at cornerback, collecting 75 tackles (5.5 for loss), 58 solo tackles (led the team), 8 interceptions (second in school history), 7 pass breakups and 2 forced fumbles. He had  3 tackles (2 for loss) and 3 interceptions (tied for second in school history) against the University of San Diego. He made 7 tackles and one pass breakup against the University of California. He had 11 tackles (10 solo), one pass breakup and one forced fumble against the University of South Alabama. He made 8 tackles (0.5 for loss) against Penn State University. He made 9 tackles (one for loss) and one interception against San Jose State University. He had 7 tackles, one interception returned for a touchdown and one forced fumble against Colorado State University.

As a senior, he started 14 games at cornerback, registering 65 tackles (3 for loss), 7 interceptions (fourth in school history), one interception returned for a touchdown, 156 interception return yards (second in the conference), 8 pass breakups and one quarterback hurry. He set a school record for career interceptions (17) and became the first player in school history with 6 or more interceptions in consecutive seasons. He had 6 tackles, 3 pass breakups and one interception against the University of California. He made 5 tackles, one interception and one quarterback hurry against Northern Illinois University. He had 5 tackles and one interception at Fresno State University. He had 4 tackles, 2 interceptions (one returned for a touchdown) and one pass breakup against the University of Hawai'i.

Professional career
On November 14, 2016, it was announced that Kazee accepted his invitation to appear in the 2017 Senior Bowl. On January 28, 2017, he appeared in the Senior Bowl and helped Cleveland Browns' head coach Hue Jackson's South team defeat the North 16–15. His overall performance impressed scouts and raised his draft stock. He was one of 35 collegiate cornerbacks to receive an invitation to the NFL Scouting Combine in Indianapolis, Indiana. He performed the majority of combine drills, but opted to skip the short shuttle and three-cone drill. 

On March 23, 2017, he attended San Diego State's Pro Day, but opted to stand on his combine numbers and performed positional drills, the short shuttle, and three-cone drills for scouts and team representatives from 29 NFL teams that attended, including Los Angeles Chargers' defensive coordinator Gus Bradley. At the conclusion of the pre-draft process, Kazee was projected to be a fourth or fifth round pick by the majority of NFL draft experts and scouts. He was ranked as the 22nd best cornerback prospect in the draft by NFLDraftScout.com.

Atlanta Falcons

2017
Kazee was selected by the Atlanta Falcons in the fifth round (149th overall) of the 2017 NFL Draft.

On May 9, 2017, the Atlanta Falcons signed Kazee to a four-year, $2.68 million contract with a signing bonus of $288,922.

Kazee entered training camp competing against Brian Poole for the starting nickel back role. Head coach Dan Quinn opted to transition him to free safety in July and Kazee showed promise throughout training camp in his new role. He was named the backup free safety to Ricardo Allen to start the  season.

He made his professional regular season debut in the Atlanta Falcons' season-opener at the Chicago Bears and made two solo tackles and forced a fumble in their 23–17 victory. On October 1, 2017, Kazee earned his first career start after Ricardo Allen was unable to play after suffering a concussion the previous week. He finished the Falcons' 23–17 loss to the Buffalo Bills with a season-high nine combined tackles and a forced fumble. He finished the season with 23 combined tackles (14 solo) and two forced fumbles in one start and 16 games.

2018

Kazee entered the 2018 season as the backup strong safety to Keanu Neal. He was named the starter following a season-ending injury to Neal in Week 1. During Week 2 against the Carolina Panthers, Kazee was ejected for making a helmet-to-helmet hit on Cam Newton. The Falcons won 31-24. In Week 3, he recorded a season-high 10 combined tackles and an interception. Kazee ended the 2018 season third on the team with 82 combined tackles, and tied for the league lead with seven interceptions with Kyle Fuller and Xavien Howard.

2019
In Week 11 against the Carolina Panthers, Kazee recorded his first interception of the season off a pass thrown by Kyle Allen in the 29–3 win. In Week 14 against the Panthers, Kazee forced a fumble on wide receiver Greg Dortch during a kickoff return which was recovered by kicker Younghoe Koo and recorded 2 more interceptions off passes thrown by Kyle Allen during the 40–20 win. Kazee finished the 2019 season with 74 combined tackles, three interceptions, and one forced fumble.

2020
In week 4 of the 2020 NFL season against the Packers, Kazee tore his Achilles' tendon, ending his season. He finished the season with 20 tackles and 1 forced fumble. He was placed on injured reserve on October 7, 2020. He finished his career with the Falcons with 199 tackles, 10 interceptions, 13 pass breakups and 5 forced fumbles.

Dallas Cowboys
On March 29, 2021, Kazee signed with the Dallas Cowboys, reuniting with defensive coordinator Dan Quinn, who was his head coach with the Falcons.

Pittsburgh Steelers
On May 3, 2022, Kazee signed a one-year contract with the Steelers. He was placed on injured reserve on September 1, 2022. He was suspended for three games on September 21, 2022. He was activated on November 10. On March 14th, 2023, the Steelers resigned Kazee to a 2 year deal.

Personal life
On October 19, 2021, Kazee was arrested and charged with driving while under the influence after he was pulled over for a traffic violation in The Colony, Texas.

NFL career statistics

Regular season

References

External links
San Diego Aztecs bio

1993 births
Living people
American football cornerbacks
American football safeties
Atlanta Falcons players
Dallas Cowboys players
Pittsburgh Steelers players
Players of American football from California
San Diego State Aztecs football players
Sportspeople from San Bernardino, California